King Solomon's Mines is a 1950 Technicolor adventure film, and the second film adaptation of the 1885 novel of the same name by Henry Rider Haggard. It stars Deborah Kerr, Stewart Granger and Richard Carlson. It was adapted by Helen Deutsch, directed by Compton Bennett and Andrew Marton and released by Metro-Goldwyn-Mayer.

Plot
In "British East Africa" (Kenya Colony) in 1897, experienced British safari guide Allan Quatermain is persuaded by Elizabeth Curtis to look for her husband, who disappeared in the unexplored African interior while searching for the legendary titular mines. She has a copy of the map he used. A tall, mysterious native, Umbopa, joins the safari, as do Elizabeth and her brother John Goode. Allan has no use for women on a safari, but during the long and grueling journey, he and Elizabeth begin to fall in love.

The party encounters Van Brun, a lone white man living with a tribe. They learn that he met Curtis. However, when Allan recognizes him as a fugitive who cannot afford to let them go, they take him hostage to leave the village safely. Van Brun tries to shoot Allan, killing his faithful right-hand man Khiva instead. Allan dispatches Van Brun, and the party flees from the angry villagers.

When they finally reach the region where the mines are supposed to be, they are met by people who resemble Umbopa. They discover that their companion is royalty; he has returned to attempt to dethrone the evil usurper King Twala (Baziga). Umbopa leaves with his supporters to raise a rebellion, while Allan, Elizabeth and John travel to a tense meeting with Twala. With his last rifle bullet, John kills a would-be attacker, temporarily quelling the natives.

The king's advisor, Gagool, communicates that they have seen Curtis and leads them to a cave that contains a trove of jewels and the skeletal remains of Elizabeth's husband. While they are distracted by this grisly discovery, Gagool sneaks away and triggers a booby trap that seals them inside the cave. They find a way out through an underground stream and return to Twala's kraal, just as Umbopa and his followers arrive.

Umbopa's people have an unusual method of deciding a disputed kingship. The two claimants duel to the death. Despite cheating by one of Twala's men, Umbopa wins. Afterwards, he provides an escort for his friends' return trip.

Cast
 Deborah Kerr as Elizabeth Curtis  
 Stewart Granger as Allan Quatermain  
 Richard Carlson as John Goode  
 Hugo Haas as Van Brun ("Smith")
 Lowell Gilmore as Eric Masters
 Kimursi as Khiva (credited as Kimursi of the Kipsigi Tribe)  
 Siriaque as Umbopa 
 Sekaryongo as Chief Gagool
 Baziga as King Twala (credited as Baziga of the Watussi Tribe)

Production
In November 1946, MGM announced they had purchased film rights to the novel from Gaumont British, who made the 1937 adaptation. Sam Zimbalist was assigned the job of producing.

In October 1948, Helen Deutsch was assigned to write the script.

MGM typically made one or two big "overseas" spectacles a year around this time. When Quo Vadis was postponed, it was decided to film King Solomon's Mines on location in Africa.

Adaptation
Like virtually all film versions, this also changes Haggard's plot to include a female lead. But it strays even further from the novel than the 1937 British adaptation King Solomon's Mines. There are several African characters in the book, particularly Umbopa, a king in disguise. In the earlier film, Paul Robeson received top billing for the role, whereas in this version, Umbopa's importance is greatly reduced.

Casting
Deborah Kerr was announced as the female lead in July 1949. MGM wanted Errol Flynn to co-star. The same month Compton Bennett was signed to direct; he had just finished That Forsyte Woman for MGM with Flynn.

Flynn eventually chose instead to star in Kim. Stewart Granger was signed to play the role in August 1949. Richard Carlson was cast in September.

Shooting
Filming took place at the following locations in Africa: Murchison Falls in Uganda; Astrida, "the land of giant Watusis"; Volcano Country and Stanleyville in the Belgian Congo; Tanganyika; and Rumuruti and Machakos in Kenya.

The film marked the beginning of Eva Monley's career as a Hollywood location scout and producer, specializing in Africa. Monley received her first film job as a script supervisor and assistant during production of King Solomon's Mines. Additionally, the cave scene was filmed in the Slaughter Canyon Cave in Carlsbad Caverns National Park and other scenes at nearby Sitting Bull Falls in Lincoln National Forest, both in the state of New Mexico, in the Southwestern United States.

In February 1950, after five months of location filming in Africa, Andrew Marton replaced Compton Bennett as director. The official reason given was Bennett fell ill but there were rumours that Bennett had a falling out with some of the cast.

Reception

Critical
Bosley Crowther of The New York Times wrote that "there is more than a trace of outright hokum in this thriller ... but there is also an ample abundance of scenic novelty and beauty to compensate." Variety called it a "striking adventure film" with "high excitement in meetings with wild savages and beasts and a number of excellently staged fights-to-the-death." Harrison's Reports called it "a highly spectacular romantic adventure melodrama that has the rare quality of holding an audience captivated from start to finish." John McCarten of The New Yorker wrote, "'King Solomon's Mines' undertakes to show what a safari through Africa might have been up against fifty years ago. In this, I think, the picture, which was shot in the African highlands, succeeds admirably." The Monthly Film Bulletin called it "a somewhat stilted epic, strangely lacking in excitement", with Kerr seeming "miscast and out of place."

Box-office
According to MGM records, the film earned $5,047,000 in the US and Canada. It made $4,908,000 elsewhere. After production and other associated costs were deducted, the movie made a profit of $4,049,000, which made it MGM's most successful film of 1950, and the second highest-grossing film of that year in the United States.

The film was the third most popular film at the British box-office in 1951. It was also a big hit in France, with admissions of 4,108,770.

Awards and nominations
Robert L. Surtees won the Academy Award for Best Cinematography, Color, while Ralph E. Winters and Conrad A. Nervig won for Best Film Editing. The film was nominated for Best Picture.

Radio adaptation
King Solomon's Mines was presented on Lux Radio Theatre on December 1, 1952. The one-hour adaptation featured Kerr and Granger in their screen roles.

References

External links
 
 
 
 
 
 King Solomon's Mines on Lux Radio Theater: December 1, 1952 
 Zone Troopers: Website about the different Allan Quatermain and King Solomon's Mine films

1950 films
1950 adventure films
American adventure films
American romantic drama films
1950s English-language films
Films based on King Solomon's Mines
Films directed by Andrew Marton
Films directed by Compton Bennett
Films set in the 1890s
Films shot in the Democratic Republic of the Congo
Films shot in Kenya
Films shot in Tanzania
Films shot in the United States
Films shot in Uganda
Films whose cinematographer won the Best Cinematography Academy Award
Films whose editor won the Best Film Editing Academy Award
Metro-Goldwyn-Mayer films
Treasure hunt films
1950s American films